Alfie McCalmont (born 25 March 2000) is a professional footballer who plays for League Two club Carlisle United, on loan from  club Leeds United, and the Northern Ireland national team as a defensive midfielder.

Career
Born in Thirsk, he attended Thirsk School and Sixth Form College and came through the youth academy at Leeds United. He signed a professional contract extension on 22 January 2019 keeping him at the club until the summer of 2021. During the 2018–19 season, he featured regularly for Carlos Corberán's Leeds United under 23s side that won the PDL Northern League 2018–19 league title; they then became the national Professional Development League Champions by beating Birmingham City in the final.

McCalmont started the first pre-season friendly of the 2019–20 season against York City in a 5–0 win on 10 July, and was named in the 1st team travelling squad on 4 August in Leeds' opening day 3–1 EFL Championship victory against Bristol City; he was left out of the final 18, but was allocated the 38 shirt for the season.

He was given his first team debut by head coach Marcelo Bielsa on 13 August in the EFL Cup against Salford City, coming on as a substitute for Jack Clarke in the 70th minute.

He made his first Leeds start on 27 August 2019 in Leeds' EFL Cup match against Stoke City, with Leeds losing 4–5 on penalties after a 2–2 draw.

After the English professional football season was paused in March 2020 due to the COVID-19 pandemic, the season was resumed during June, where McCalmont was part of the squad who earned promotion with Leeds to the Premier League and also become the EFL Championship Champions for the 2019–20 season in July after the successful resumption of the season. Despite not playing a League game he qualified for a league medal due to being named in enough matchday squads.

In August 2020, McCalmont signed a new four-year contract with Leeds United. He was named on the bench by Marcelo Bielsa on 16 September 2020 as an unused substitute for Premier League Leeds in a 1–1 draw against Hull City in the EFL Cup.

Loan spells
He joined Oldham Athletic on a season-long loan on 25 September 2020. He scored his first goals for Oldham, and his first professional goals, when he scored twice on 10 November 2020 in an EFL Trophy group game against Bradford City. In July 2021, McCalmont joined Morecambe on loan for the 2021–22 season. On 9 January 2023, McCalmont joined Carlisle United on a loan until the end of the season.

International career
He has represented Northern Ireland at international level up to U21s. He was called up to the senior Northern Ireland squad in 2019 for a summer training camp.

He made his senior debut for Northern Ireland on 5 September 2019 coming on for George Saville as a 60th-minute substitute in a 1–0 win against Luxembourg.

He was recalled to the Northern Irish national team for matches against Malta and Ukraine in June 2021 after impressing with Oldham Athletic with 8 goals and 5 assists in League 2.

McCalmont made his competitive senior international debut on 2 September 2021 coming on for Jordan Thompson as an 82nd-minute substitute in a 1–4 win against Lithuania in FIFA World Cup European Qualifying.

Style of play
McCalmont plays as a deep lying central midfielder. He plays mainly as a playmaking defensive midfielder, known for his passing and ability on the ball, dictating the play.

Belfast Live said McCalmont has "excellent technique, is tenacious in the tackle and has an eye for a pass".

Career statistics

Club

International

Honours
Leeds United
EFL Championship: 2019–20

References 

2000 births
Living people
People from Thirsk
Association footballers from Northern Ireland
Northern Ireland youth international footballers
English footballers
English people of Northern Ireland descent
Association football fullbacks
Leeds United F.C. players
Oldham Athletic A.F.C. players
Morecambe F.C. players
Carlisle United F.C. players
English Football League players
Northern Ireland under-21 international footballers
Northern Ireland international footballers